Scanship is a Norwegian company that produces wastewater purification and waste management systems for 
ferries, cruise ships, disaster relief and merchant shipping.

The company is headquartered in Tønsberg, Norway while the publicly listed holding company which holds all the
shares in the company is located in Lysaker.

Scanship has operations in Norway, the United States, Canada, Poland and Italy.

The company started trading on Oslo Axess on April 11, 2014.

References

Manufacturing companies established in 2007
Companies based in Tønsberg
Companies listed on Oslo Axess
Norwegian companies established in 2007